Rachelle Anne Cabral (born October 5, 1985 in Cagayan Valley, Tuguegarao), is a Filipino archer from the Republic of the Philippines.
 
Cabral represented the Philippines in Archery at the 2012 Summer Olympics.  She underwent 10 days of training in South Korea under Korean coach Chung Jae Yun.  Cabral competed in the women's individual event. She scored 627 in the ranking round held on July 28, which placed her 48th out of 64 competitors. In the first round she faced Inna Stepanova of Russia and lost.

References

Living people

1985 births

Filipino female archers

People from Tuguegarao
Sportspeople from Cagayan
Olympic archers of the Philippines
Archers at the 2012 Summer Olympics
Archers at the 2002 Asian Games
Archers at the 2006 Asian Games
Southeast Asian Games bronze medalists for the Philippines
Southeast Asian Games medalists in archery
Competitors at the 2005 Southeast Asian Games
Asian Games competitors for the Philippines